Veer Yagya Dutt Sharma (21 October 1922 in Takhatgarh village, Ropar district, Punjab Province, India – 4 July 1996 in New Delhi)(formerly known as Banarsi Dass Chandan was an Indian politician, who has been associated with RSS and one of the founding member of Bhartiya Jan Sangh,  was a member of fourth and sixth Lok Sabha representing Amritsar  and Gurdaspur  parliamentary constituencies in Punjab during 1967-70 and 1977–79. He was also a leader of Bharatiya Janata Party. His memorable contribution in establishing Bhartiya Jan Sangh in the rural areas of hills of Punjab ( Kangra Una Hamirpur & Shimla)which are presently the part of Himachal Pradesh deserves a special mention .
He was the Governor of Odisha from 1990 to 1993.

An ayurvedic physician by profession, he worked to improve indigenous system of medicine and to promote the ayurvedic system of medicine. During the famines of 1943 in Bengal  and Kangra-Kula valley in 1945–46, he along with a team of doctors from Punjab provided relief to the famine-stricken people.

He also worked for the relief and rehabilitation of refugees in 1947 and rendered medical assistance to the sick.

References

External links
Biodata
  

Bharatiya Janata Party politicians from Punjab
Governors of Odisha
Indian Hindus
People from Rupnagar district
1922 births
1996 deaths
India MPs 1967–1970
India MPs 1977–1979
Lok Sabha members from Punjab, India
Bharatiya Jana Sangh politicians
Janata Party politicians
Politicians from Amritsar district